The Great North of England Railway (GNER) was an early British railway company.  Its main line, opened in 1841 was between York and Darlington, and originally it was planned to extend to Newcastle.

Mergers
In 1846 it was absorbed by the Newcastle and Darlington Junction Railway. Soon afterwards, the combined company was renamed the York and Newcastle Railway. In 1847, this amalgamated with the Newcastle and Berwick Railway to form the York, Newcastle and Berwick Railway and this amalgamated with other railways in 1854 to form the North Eastern Railway (NER).

Locomotives

Locomotive list

Notes
 GNER = Great North of England Railway
 NER = North Eastern Railway
 Names and NER numbers may not be in correct order (source is vague)

References

Further reading

Railway companies established in 1836
Railway lines opened in 1841
Railway companies disestablished in 1846
1836 establishments in England
North Eastern Railway (UK)
1846 disestablishments in England